The Pantech C300 is the world's smallest camera flip phone available commercially. It is manufactured by the South Korean cellphone company Pantech Curitel. The Pantech C300's dimensions are 2.72 by 1.69 by .76 inches. The C300 is licensed by AT&T Mobility and iWireless in the U.S. and Rogers Wireless in Canada.

The Pantech C300's features include:

Flash camera
Picture and video messaging
World phone
MP3 ringtones
Instant messaging
Speakerphone and call forwarding
Calendar with reminders

Some criticisms of the phone are that it is quite bulky depth-wise for its small length and width.

References

Cited

Mobile phones by company